South Carolina elected its members October 11–12, 1824.

See also 
 1825 South Carolina's 1st congressional district special election
 1824 and 1825 United States House of Representatives elections
 List of United States representatives from South Carolina

Notes 

1824
South Carolina
United States House of Representatives